Vilhelm (Ville) Nikkanen (4 July 1885, Uusikirkko Vpl - 5 August 1960) was a Finnish farmer and politician. He was a member of the Parliament of Finland from 1919 to 1933, representing the National Coalition Party.

References

1885 births
1960 deaths
People from Vyborg District
People from Viipuri Province (Grand Duchy of Finland)
National Coalition Party politicians
Members of the Parliament of Finland (1919–22)
Members of the Parliament of Finland (1922–24)
Members of the Parliament of Finland (1924–27)
Members of the Parliament of Finland (1927–29)
Members of the Parliament of Finland (1929–30)
Members of the Parliament of Finland (1930–33)